Ophiclinus ningulus, the variable snake-blenny, is a species of clinid found in reefs around southern Australia, preferring areas with plentiful growth of sponges at depths of from .  It can reach a maximum length of  TL.

References

ningulus
Fish described in 1980
Taxa named by Victor G. Springer